Juedai Shuangjiao is a wuxia novel by Gu Long first published in 1966. The novel is about a pair of twin brothers who, because of a feud between two formidable martial artists, were separated at birth and raised on opposing sides. , it has been adapted into four films and eight television series.

Plot 
Eighteen years ago, a handsome martial artist, Jiang Feng, was injured in a fight and coincidentally saved by the sisters Yaoyue and Lianxing of Yihua Palace, one of the deadliest martial arts clans in the jianghu (martial artists' community). Yaoyue fell in love with Jiang Feng, but he rejected her despite her beauty because her arrogance put him off. He fell in love with the sisters' servant, Hua Yuenu, impregnated her and fled with her. Jiang Feng's jealous servant, Jiang Biehe, betrayed his master and caused a group of bandits to attack Jiang Feng and Hua Yuenu shortly after Hua had just given birth to a pair of twin boys.

Although Jiang Feng and Hua Yuenu died, their sons were unharmed and discovered by Yaoyue and Lianxing. Yaoyue refused to forgive Jiang Feng for scorning her and vowed to take revenge by making his sons destroy each other. The sisters then adopt one of the boys, whom they name Hua Wuque. The other boy, known as Xiaoyuer, is initially saved by his father's sworn brother, Yan Nantian, a powerful swordsman, but later falls into the hands of the Ten Great Villains, a group of notorious criminals in the jianghu. However, the Villains did not harm Xiaoyuer and instead decide to raise him and train him to become the greatest villain in the history of the jianghu.

Hua Wuque grows up to be a good-mannered, refined gentleman well-trained in the elegant martial arts of Yihua Palace. On the other hand, Xiaoyuer is trained by the Ten Great Villains in a wide range of not-so-powerful martial arts and other skills such as theft, deception, the use of poison, and the art of disguise. Once he is old enough, the streetwise Xiaoyuer ventures out into the jianghu alone and relies on his wits and skills on a series of adventures. During this time, he gets embroiled in complicated romantic relationships with various women, including Tie Xinlan, Su Ying and Zhang Jing.

In the meantime, Yaoyue sends Hua Wuque to kill Xiaoyuer, lying to him that Xiaoyuer poses a dangerous threat to them. Against the backdrop of various escapades, the twins come to blows several times. Each of their encounters follows the same pattern. Hua Wuque is more powerful in martial arts than Xiaoyuer, but the latter always manages to survive by using his wits to escape from the former. The twins are initially hostile towards each other and have wildly different personalities; Hua Wuque is righteous, intelligent but naïve, while Xiaoyuer is expedient, streetwise and cunning. However, they gradually develop mutual respect and become friends after braving danger together. At the same time, they become entangled in a love triangle with Tie Xinlan.

Determined to make the twins kill each other, Yaoyue eventually forces Hua Wuque to challenge Xiaoyuer to a duel to the death. After Xiaoyuer is apparently killed by Hua Wuque during the duel, Yaoyue reveals the truth to Hua Wuque and tells him about her plan to make their father pay the ultimate price for scorning her. Hua Wuque is horrified after learning the truth and realising that Xiaoyuer is actually his twin brother. Just then, Xiaoyuer comes back to life, having feigned death earlier by consuming a special drug. The twins finally recognise and acknowledge each other as brothers, thus putting an end to Yaoyue's evil plan and ending the story on a happy note.

Characters

Main characters 
 Xiaoyuer, born Jiang Xiaoyu, is Jiang Feng and Hua Yuenu's son. He was raised by five of the Ten Great Villains and trained to become a great villain. Though his body is covered in scars due to his brutal upbringing, he possesses considerable charm and rugged good looks, which allow him to leave a lasting impression on every woman he meets. Although a respectable fighter, Xiaoyuer prefers to rely on his intelligence, cunning, and a variety of skills such as thievery and deception to overcome challenges. However, when he encounters Hua Wuque, he realises that he cannot rely on tricks alone to stay alive, so he starts honing his fighting skills and ultimately turns into a formidable martial artist in his own right. Although his tough upbringing causes him to adopt a callous, hedonistic persona in public, he has a strong moral compass and is naturally kind and protective of others.
 Hua Wuque is Xiaoyuer's fraternal twin brother, and the heir to Yihua Palace and its only male resident. Bearing a striking resemblance to his father, he looks extraordinarily handsome and has a more androgynous appearance compared to his brother. He is highly respected in the jianghu for his formidable prowess in martial arts and his gentlemanly, graceful manners. However, he has a tendency to suppress his emotions and has a naive outlook towards life.
 Tie Xinlan is Tie Zhan's daughter. Although she has a beautiful appearance and seems soft-hearted, she is actually strong-willed, brash and extremely stubborn. A decently good fighter, she has been trained by her father to use the "Berserk Hundred Hits". She falls madly in love with Xiaoyuer even though he initially treats her badly. She later falls in love with Hua Wuque, who has strong feelings for her. This results in her becoming entangled in a love triangle between the brothers, and she often has to intervene to prevent them from fighting.
 Su Ying is Wei Wuya's foster daughter. Spoiled, arrogant, scheming and anti-social, she is well-versed in medicine and extremely cunning but quite mediocre in martial arts. Her intelligence enables her to manipulate many martial artists, while her beautiful appearance and indifferent personality are similar to those of Yaoyue and Lianxing – which was why Wei Wuya adopted her. When she meets Xiaoyuer, she falls in love with him and decides to follow him until she wins his heart. She is more intelligent than him and knows how to bend him to her will.
 Yan Nantian, nicknamed "Best Divine Swordsman Under Heaven", is Jiang Feng's sworn brother and one of the most powerful martial artists in the novel. His prowess in swordplay is unmatched in the jianghu and his "swordsman aura" can be even felt from a distance. Massive in stature and dressed like a pauper, he is so powerful that he can shave a man bald in a single sword movement without the man noticing it. After he is ambushed and knocked unconscious by the Ten Great Villains, he is revived by Wan Chunliu, who kept him alive under the pretext of using his comatose body to test new drugs. When he regains consciousness, he realises that he has lost his prowess in martial arts, so he trains for many months to regain his powers and eventually surpasses his original self. He serves as Xiaoyuer's role model and trains him in martial arts.
 Lu Zhongyuan, nicknamed "Great Hero of the Southern Sky", is Yan Nantian's close friend and one of the most powerful martial artists in the novel. In his prime, he had defeated Du Sha before but had lost to Wei Wuya and had disappeared from the jianghu for several years before reemerging. He dies after falling into a trap set by Jiang Yulang.
 Jiang Feng, nicknamed "Yulang" was Xiaoyuer and Hua Wuque's father. He met Hua Yuenu of Yihua Palace, fell in love with her and eventually eloped with her. He committed suicide to join his wife after she was killed.

Yihua Palace 
 Yaoyue is the first mistress of Yihua Palace and a formidable martial artist. Although she possesses beauty, charisma and skill, she is described by Jiang Feng as "not a living person or human being, but fire, a block, ice or a sword instead". Jiang Feng rejects her and elopes with Hua Yuenu. Angered, Yaoyue pursues and hunts down the couple. After Jiang Feng and Hua Yuenu die, Yaoyue intends to kill their twin boys but Lianxing stops her. The sisters choose one of the twins and raise him as their son and groom him to be the heir to Yihua Palace.
 Lianxing is the second mistress of Yihua Palace and Yaoyue's younger sister. She is described to be a sweet and pretty woman whose beauty surpasses that of a flower blooming in spring. According to Xiaoyue'er, in comparison to Yaoyue, Lianxing is warmer in character than her sister. This is confirmed by Tie Pinggu, because Lianxing, like Yaoyue, had also fallen in love with Jiang Feng, but was afraid to express her feelings for fear of her sister. After Jiang Feng and Hua Yuenu die, Lianxing saves the twins by suggesting to make them kill each other when they are grown up instead of killing them now. Throughout the novel, it is hinted that Lianxing, unlike Yaoyue, does not take the revenge plot seriously. Hua Wuque sees Lianxing as a mother-figure and treats her with love and respect. Compared with Yaoyue and Yan Nantian, Lianxing is slightly weaker in martial arts than her sister, but equal to Yan Nantian.
 Hua Yuenu was a servant of Yihua Palace. She met Jiang Feng by chance, fell in love with him, and eventually eloped with him. She was killed shortly after giving birth to Xiaoyuer and Hua Wuque.
 Tie Pinggu is a servant of Yihua Palace who helps Xiaoyuer escape from Yaoyue. She is deceived by Jiang Yulang and loses her virginity to him, and is used as bait to lure Xiaoyuer into a trap. After she is abandoned by Jiang Yulang, she feels dejected and chooses to join Hu Yaoshi and the Twelve Zodiac.
 He Lu is a servant of Yihua Palace.

Villains' Valley 
The "Ten Great Villains" are ten notorious criminals in the jianghu who live in Villains' Valley in the Kunlun Mountains. In spite of their collective nickname, they are not an official group per se because they often operate independently. Besides, their notoriety is due more to their various eccentricities and quirks rather than actual villainy. Five of them raised and trained Xiaoyuer.
 Du Sha, nicknamed "Blood Hand", is a ruthless killer who has a metal hook to replace his right hand after it is cut off by Yan Nantian in a fight. Despite his notoriety, he stands by his principles and genuinely cares for Xiaoyuer.
 Tu Jiaojiao, nicknamed "Neither Male Nor Female", is highly skilled in the art of disguise and his/her true sex cannot be determined. He/she taught Xiaoyuer how to disguise himself and how to flirt with women.
 Hahaer, nicknamed "A Dagger Hidden Behind a Smile", is a fat monk originally from Shaolin. He is notorious for putting people off guard by smiling at them and pretending to be friendly, and killing them with a dagger when they are unaware.
 Li Dazhui, nicknamed "Does Not Eat Human Heads", is a cannibalistic killer known for eating his victims' entire bodies except their heads, hence his nickname. He previously married Tie Wushuang's daughter but killed and ate her in anger after learning that she had an affair behind his back.
 Yin Jiuyou, nicknamed "Half Human, Half Ghost", is highly skilled in qinggong and specialises in disguising himself as a ghost to scare people.
 Tie Zhan, nicknamed "Crazy Lion", is Tie Zhan's father. Notorious for challenging others to fights, he goes berserk in fits of rage and has injured innocent people before.
 Xuanyuan Sanguang, nicknamed "Evil Gambler", is an ugly-looking, one-eyed gambler.
 Xiao Mimi, nicknamed "Takes No Responsibility for Killing People with Her Charm", is a beautiful woman notorious for seducing many martial artists in the jianghu.
 Ouyang Ding and Ouyang Dang, nicknamed "Would Rather Die Than Suffer a Loss, Risk His Life to Gain Any Advantage", are a pair of identical twin brothers who pretend to be a single person to con others.
 Bai Kaixin, nicknamed "Harm Others Without Benefiting Himself", is a lecherous hooligan notorious for sowing discord among others. He plots with Ma Yiyun to kill all the other Villains.
 Wan Chunliu is a physician who moved to Villains' Valley after killing 98 patients due to an accidental mistake. He is held in high regard by the Villains as he is the only person in the valley who is trained in medicine.

Murong family and associates 
The Murong family is an influential and well-connected family of nine sisters based in Jiangnan who specialise in qinggong and the use of anqi (projectile weapons). Their power and influence stem from the sisters' marriages to other notable figures in the jianghu.

 Murong Yi is the oldest of the nine sisters. Her husband is Chen Fengchao, who is nicknamed "Beautiful Jade Swordsman".
 Murong Shuang is the second of the nine sisters and the most powerful in martial arts among them. Her husband is Nangong Liu of the Nangong family.
 Murong Shanshan is the third of the nine sisters. Her husband is Qin Jian, the leader of the wulin alliance in Guangdong and Guangxi.
 Fourth Lady Murong is the fourth of the nine sisters. Her husband is Mei Zhongliang, who is nicknamed "Plum Flower Gentleman".
 Fifth Lady Murong is the fifth of the nine sisters. Her husband is Luo Mingdao, who is nicknamed "Divine-Eyed Scholar".
 Sixth Lady Murong is the sixth of the nine sisters. Her husband is "Little White Dragon".
 Seventh Lady Murong is the seventh of the nine sisters. Her husband is Liu Heren, who is nicknamed "Scholar of Dongting".
 Eighth Lady Murong is the eighth of the nine sisters. Her husband is Zuo Chunsheng, who is nicknamed "Guest of Ten Thousand Flowers".
 Murong Jiu is the youngest of the nine sisters. She seems very cold towards people because she practises the "Rock Altering Divine Skill", which allows her to cultivate inner energy by suppressing her emotions. When Xiaoyuer accidentally disrupts her practice, she swears vengeance on him and apparently kills him, but he survives and disguises himself as a ghost to scare her. Eventually, she is moved by Black Spider's love towards her and marries him.
 Black Spider is a martial artist who dresses in a tight black suit and has a mechanical device strapped to his wrist capable of shooting spider web fluid at enemies. He is an expert in qinggong and is capable of scaling walls with his "Flying Silver Threads". He has a strong ego and likes to play the role of an older sibling to his friends. Although he is in love with Murong Jiu, he is afraid to confess to her so he only watches her from a distance. When Murong Jiu ventures into the jianghu, he follows her closely and protects her with his life. They are married eventually.
 Gu Renyu, nicknamed "Jade Faced Divine Fist", is a cousin of the Murong sisters. An honest and simple man, he is easily embarrassed. He practises his family's fist movements, which complements Zhang Jing's palm skills. He is initially ordered by his mother to woo Murong Jiu, but falls in love with Zhang Jing instead and eventually marries her.
 Zhang Jing, nicknamed "Little Fairy", is beautiful in appearance but fiery-tempered. Although she is not powerful in martial arts, her moves are very fast so she proves a challenge to stronger fighters. To comfort her mother, she accompanies Tie Xinlan to find the treasure left behind by her mother's ex-lover, Yan Nantian. Along the way, she meets Xiaoyuer, who gives her her first kiss. She ultimately marries Gu Renyu.

Jiang family 
 Jiang Biehe is Xiaoyuer's primary nemesis. He was originally Jiang Feng's servant and was previously known as Jiang Qin. He betrayed his master for monetary rewards and became an influential nobleman and martial artist. Though brutal and ruthless, he is highly intelligent and adept at deception. Over the years, he has cultivated the public image of a hero, while secretly engaging in criminal activities. When Xiaoyuer attempts to expose his hypocrisy, he attacks Xiaoyuer verbally and accuses him of committing the very atrocities he is responsible for. He is ultimately defeated and crippled by Yan Nantian, who sends him to Xiaoyuer. Xiaoyuer spares his life and allows him to leave.
 Jiang Yulang is Jiang Biehe's son who has a pale complexion and feminine appearance. Trained by his father in martial arts, he was groomed to support his father in his quest to dominate the jianghu. He is good at charming and seducing women, and his many "trophies" include Tie Pinggu.

Twelve Zodiac 
The "Twelve Zodiac" are a group of bandits ranked according to the twelve Chinese zodiac signs.

 The Rat is represented by Wei Wuya, Su Ying's foster father and the most powerful in the group.
 The Ox is represented by Huang Niu.
 The Tiger is represented by Bai Shanjun, Ma Yiyun's husband and the second most powerful in the group.
 The Rabbit is represented by Hu Yaoshi, who eventually marries Tie Pinggu.
 The Dragon is represented by an unnamed member who serves as the group's nominal leader and is only mentioned by name in the novel.
 The Snake is represented by Bishe Shenjun.
 The Horse is represented by Ma Yiyun, who is originally Bai Shanjun's wife. She marries Bai Kaixin later and plots with him to kill the "Ten Great Villains".
 The Goat is represented by Bai Yang.
 The Monkey is originally represented by Jinyuanxing and later Xianguo Shenjun.
 The Rooster, also known as Sichenke, is represented by five or six members.
 The Dog, also known as Heiquanxing, is represented by six or seven members.
 The Pig is represented by Heimianjun.

Others 
 Taohua is a nomad maiden from the Mongolian steppes. She is the first maiden Xiaoyuer meets on his adventures and she plays a hospitable host to him.
 Hai Hongzhu is the only child of Hai Laodie, the leader of a wandering performance troupe. Xiaoyuer disguises himself and sneaks into the troupe, where she meets him and falls in love with him.
 Duan Sangu is the daughter of Duan Hefei, a wealthy merchant. She appreciates Xiaoyuer's talents and recruits him to be in charge of the medicine shop. On one occasion, she helps Xiaoyuer solve a mystery.
 Taoist Shenxi is the leader of the Emei School.
 Liu Yuru is nicknamed "Snow Blossom Saber".
 Feng Tianyu is nicknamed "Divine Dragon Sword from Guanwai".
 Zhao Quanhai is the leader of an alliance of 17 security companies.
 Wang Yizhua, nicknamed "Sees People as Chickens", is an elderly martial artist specialising in the "Eagle Claw".
 Master Huangji is the abbot of Rooster's Crow Monastery on Mount Wutai.
 Xiaoyun Jushi is an expert in qigong and a close friend of Master Huangji.
 Sun Tiannan is the leader of the Tiannan Sword School.
 Qiu Qingbo is the head of the Qiu family of Zhejiang specialising in using the spear.

Adaptations

Films

Television

Comics 
In 1997, Hong Kong cartoonist Ho Chi-man drew a manhua series for the novel.

Wong Yuk-long's comic, Force of Buddha's Palm has a long story arc which reproduces much of Gu Long's novels. This story arc was included in an English translation published in the United States by Jademan Comics from 1989 to 1993.

Ho Che Wen created three comic series based on this story under the title The Impeccable Twins. The first series follow the novel but the second and the third series expand on events after the end of the novel.

Animation 
In 2022, Tencent released the donghua (chinese animation) version on WeTV Indonesia, Thailand, and China.

Video games 
  (1999)
  II (2000)
  III (2002)
 online (2005)
  (2006)

References 

 
Novels by Gu Long
1966 novels